Xerosecta cespitum is a species of small air-breathing land snail, a terrestrial pulmonate gastropod mollusk in the family Geomitridae, the hairy snails and their allies. 

This snail is native to south Spain, Mallorca, southern France, northwestern Italy, Corsica, Sardinia, Elba, and Morocco to Tunisia.

This species of snail makes and uses love darts as part of mating behavior.

References

 Bank, R. A.; Neubert, E. (2017). Checklist of the land and freshwater Gastropoda of Europe. Last update: July 16th, 2017

External links
 Xerosecta cespitum at AnimalBase
 Image of Xerosecta cespitum at gireaud.net
 Draparnaud, J. P. R. (1801). Tableau des mollusques terrestres et fluviatiles de la France. Montpellier / Paris (Renaud / Bossange, Masson & Besson). 1-116

Geomitridae
Gastropods described in 1801